is a 2018 Japanese comedy film directed by Yasuo Tsuruhashi.

Cast 
Abe Hiroshi as Hironoshin Kobayashi
Shinobu Terajima as Omine
Etsushi Toyokawa as Seibee
Takumi Saitoh as Tomonosuke Saeki 
Morio Kazama as Jinbee

References

External links 
  
 

2018 films
2018 comedy films
2010s historical comedy films
Japanese comedy films
2010s Japanese-language films
Toho films
Films set in the Edo period
2010s Japanese films